The 1928 Giro d'Italia was the 16th edition of the Giro d'Italia, organized and sponsored by the newspaper La Gazzetta dello Sport. The race was won by Alfredo Binda of the Legnano team. Second and third respectively were the Italian riders Giuseppe Pancera and Bartolomeo Aymo.

It was the edition with the highest number of participants (298), with 126 riders completing the race.

Once again Binda dominated the Giro, also winning 6 stages. Five stages were won by Domenico Piemontesi, who still didn't succeed in challenging Binda for the lead in the general classification.

The eighth stage was won by Albino Binda (Alfredo's brother and team-mate). Alfredo himself later admitted that he advised his brother to escape from the group the moment he stopped to change a tire (common operation before the introduction of derailleur gears).

Participants

Of the 298 riders that began the Giro d'Italia on 12 May, 126 of them made it to the finish in Milan on 3 June. Riders were allowed to ride on their own or as a member of a team. There were seven teams that competed in the race: Alcyon-Hutchinson, Aliprandi-Pirelli, Atala-Pirelli, Bianchi-Pirelli, Diamant Continental, Touring Pirelli, and Wolsit Pirelli. In addition there were five groups that entered the race: Legione Ciclisti, U.S. Legnanese, Varese Sportiva, U.S. Viareggio, and U.S. Abbiatense.

The peloton was primarily composed of Italians. The field featured three former Giro d'Italia champions in three-time winner Giovanni Brunero, twice a winner and reigning champion Alfredo Binda, and single-time winner Giuseppe Enrici. Other notable Italian riders that started the race included Bartolomeo Aymo and Domenico Piemontesi.

Final standings

Stage results

General classification

There were 126 cyclists who had completed all twelve stages. For these cyclists, the times they had needed in each stage was added up for the general classification. The cyclist with the least accumulated time was the winner. Alessandro Catalani won the prize for best ranked independent rider in the general classification.

References

Footnotes

Citations

Bibliography

Giro d'Italia by year
Giro d'Italia, 1928
Giro d'Italia, 1928
Giro d'Italia
Giro d'Italia